Swagger is the debut studio album by the Celtic punk band Flogging Molly, mixed by Steve Albini. It was released in 2000.

Reception 
In a very positive review, AllMusic called Swagger a combination of the "folk of the Pogues with an Oi! blast by way of the Dropkick Murphys". The reviewer went on to call the album "music that's perfect for any barroom brawl."
Punknews.org gave the album 5 out of 5 stars and said that "every song is a keeper, without a clunker in the bunch". The review also called "Salty Dog" the "quintessential Flogging Molly song" and noted the album's contrast between aggressive punk-influenced songs and slower ballads like "The Worst Day Since Yesterday".

In popular culture 
"The Worst Day Since Yesterday" was used as the music for the opening and closing montage in Stargate: Universe season 1, episode 9, "Life" (first broadcast November 20, 2009).
"The Worst Day Since Yesterday" was heard in the background in the bar scene in Mr. and Mrs. Smith.
"Selfish Man" was used during the closing scene, and over the closing credits, of the fourth episode of Showtime's Brotherhood.
"The Ol' Beggars Bush" was playing the bar when Dean picked up Rory in the fourth-season episode "Last Week Fights, This Week Tights" of Gilmore Girls.
"Devil's Dance Floor" was used in Derry Girls, episode 5 of series 1.

Track listing 
All lyrics written by Dave King, all musics composed by Flogging Molly, except where noted.
 "Salty Dog" – 2:21
 "Selfish Man" – 2:54
 "The Worst Day Since Yesterday" – 3:38
 "Every Dog Has Its Day" – 4:24
 "Life in a Tenement Square" (Dave King, John Donovan, Matt Hensley, Nathen Maxwell, Bridget Regan, Bob Schmidt, George Schwindt) – 3:11
 "The Ol' Beggars Bush" – 4:34
 "The Likes of You Again" – 4:33
 "Black Friday Rule" (King, Ted Hutt, Dennis Casey, Hensley, Maxwell, Regan, Schmidt, Schwindt) – 6:57
 "Grace of God Go I" – 1:55
 "Devil's Dance Floor" – 3:59
 "These Exiled Years" (Dave King, John Donovan, Matt Hensley, Nathen Maxwell, Bridget Regan, Bob Schmidt, George Schwindt) – 5:15
 "Sentimental Johnny" – 4:47
 "Far Away Boys" – 5:06

Personnel 
Dave King – lead vocals, acoustic guitar
Bridget Regan – fiddle, tin whistle
Matt Hensley – accordion
Nathen Maxwell – bass guitar
Bob Schmidt – mandolin, banjo
George Schwindt – drums, percussion
John Donovan – electric guitar, acoustic guitar
Gary Schwindt – trumpet

Charts

References 

Flogging Molly albums
2000 debut albums
SideOneDummy Records albums